Torstein Selvik (8 October 1900 – 10 September 1983) was a Norwegian politician for the Labour Party.

He was born in Haus.

Despite being almost 40 years old at the time, Selvik fought in the 1940 Norwegian Campaign with the 4th Brigade in Valdres.

He was elected to the Norwegian Parliament from Bergen in 1950, and was re-elected on four occasions.

References

1900 births
1983 deaths
People from Hordaland
Norwegian Army personnel of World War II
Norwegian newspaper editors
Labour Party (Norway) politicians
Members of the Storting
20th-century Norwegian writers
20th-century Norwegian politicians